Georges Martin (6 November 1915 – 3 January 2010) was a French racing cyclist. He rode in the 1947, 1948 and 1949 Tour de France.

References

External links
 

1915 births
2010 deaths
French male cyclists
Sportspeople from Rhône (department)
Cyclists from Auvergne-Rhône-Alpes